These are the official results of the Women's Heptathlon competition at the 1990 European Championships in Split, Yugoslavia. The competition was held  at Stadion Poljud on 30 August and 31 August 1990.

Medalists

Results

Final
30/31 August

Participation
According to an unofficial count, 21 athletes from 12 countries participated in the event.

 (1)
 (3)
 (2)
 (1)
 (1)
 (1)
 (1)
 (2)
 (2)
 (3)
 (3)
 (1)

See also
 1986 Women's European Championships Heptathlon (Stuttgart)
 1988 Women's Olympic Heptathlon (Seoul)
 1990 Hypo-Meeting
 1991 Women's World Championships Heptathlon (Tokyo)
 1992 Women's Olympic Heptathlon (Barcelona)

References

 Results

Heptathlon
Combined events at the European Athletics Championships
1990 in women's athletics